Luxembourg was represented by Spanish duo Baccara, with the song "Parlez-vous français ?", at the 1978 Eurovision Song Contest, which took place on 22 April in Paris. For only the second time, broadcaster RTL organised a public national final rather than their usual method of internal selection.

Baccara were one of the most internationally famous acts ever to appear at Eurovision, being already known throughout Europe from two recent hugely successful singles, "Yes Sir, I Can Boogie" (which had spent a week at the top of the UK Singles Chart in late 1977) and "Sorry, I'm a Lady". "Parlez-vous français ?" was written by Frank Dostal, who had also penned the duo's previous recordings. There was some degree of facetious comment that so similar was it to the two hits that it should have been called "Yes Sir, I'm a Lady". However Baccara were to find (as had Silver Convention the year before) that being a big-name act did not necessarily translate into Eurovision success.

Before Eurovision

National final 
No detail on date, location, host or scoring system is currently known about the national final. Five acts took part, including Gitte Hænning who had represented Germany in 1973 and Liliane Saint-Pierre who would sing for Belgium in 1987.

At Eurovision 
On the night of the final Baccara performed 17th in the running order, following Denmark and preceding eventual contest winners Israel. Although their commercial success made them among the favourites to win prior to the contest, ultimately, "Parlez-vous français ?" was never in contention for victory and finished the evening with 73 points. This placed Luxembourg 7th of the 20 entries. The song had received maximum 12s from Italy, Portugal and (unsurprisingly) Spain, but had been ignored completely by seven other national juries. The Luxembourgish jury awarded its 12 points to Israel.

Voting

References

1978
Countries in the Eurovision Song Contest 1978
Eurovision